Hamilton County School District (HCSD) is a school district headquartered on the grounds of Hamilton County High School in unincorporated Hamilton County, Florida, south of Jasper. It serves the entire county.

History

Circa 2003 the school district had about 2,100 students. It previously had its headquarters in another unincorporated area in the county.

Schools

 Hamilton County High School (Unincorporated area) - serves middle school and high school
 Hamilton County Elementary School (Unincorporated area)

Former schools:
 Greenwood School (K-12)
 Elementary schools:
 Central Hamilton Elementary School (Jasper)
 North Hamilton Elementary School (Jennings)
 South Hamilton Elementary School (White Springs)

Hamilton County Elementary School
The district consolidated three elementary schools into the new Hamilton County Elementary School, located at the high school site. Four of the five school board members agreed to the consolidation during an April 14, 2014 vote. The district originally planned to build it at the JRE Lee Complex, but on June 9, 2014 the district decided to change the location of the school. The Florida Legislature approved the school's funding, and groundbreaking was held on July 11, 2016. Culpeper/Gray is the architect. Opening was scheduled for August 2017.

References

External links
 
Education in Hamilton County, Florida